Korenlei is a quay in the historic city center of Ghent, Belgium, located on the left bank of the Leie river. The quay on the opposite bank of the Leie is Graslei.

References

World Heritage Sites in Belgium
Buildings and structures in Ghent
Geography of Ghent
Tourist attractions in Ghent